The Pipes is a 1966 Czechoslovak film directed by Vojtěch Jasný. It was entered into the 1966 Cannes Film Festival.

Cast

 Walter Giller as George Randy
 Gitte Hænning as Mary Randy
 Juraj Herz as William Poker
 Václav Lohniský as Film Director
  Jaroslav Štercl
 Vivi Bach as Else
 Jana Brejchová as Lady Mary
 Karel Effa
 Josef Hlinomaz as Old-clothes Man
 Vladimír Hrubý
 Jan Kačer as John
 Waldemar Matuška as Marcello
 Vladimír Menšík
 Richard Münch as Lord Edward
 Vít Olmer as Lord William
 Gerhard Riedmann as Kurt

References

External links
 

1966 films
Czechoslovak comedy films
1950s Czech-language films
Films directed by Vojtěch Jasný
Czech comedy films
Czech anthology films
Films based on short fiction
1960s Czech films